The 2006 All-Ireland Senior Camogie Championship Final was the 75th All-Ireland Final and the deciding match of the 2006 All-Ireland Senior Camogie Championship, an inter-county camogie tournament for the top teams in Ireland.

Cork's comprehensive win marked the end of the great Tipperary teams; Tipp only scored one point in the second half. This was also the first goalless final.

References

All-Ireland Senior Camogie Championship Final
All-Ireland Senior Camogie Championship Final
All-Ireland Senior Camogie Championship Final, 2006
All-Ireland Senior Camogie Championship Finals
Cork county camogie team matches
Tipperary county camogie team matches